Cathy Dorin-Lizzi (born December 18, 1966) is a professional ten-pin bowler who has won multiple national titles as a member of the Professional Women's Bowling Association.

Dorin-Lizzi, from Linden, New Jersey, is the sister of professional bowler Carolyn Dorin-Ballard.

As a professional bowler, Dorin-Lizzi was the AMF World Cup 3rd place finisher 1992. She won the PWBA Three Rivers Open in 1999.

Dorin-Lizzi and her sister Carolyn have been commentators on ESPN's bowling tournament coverage.

She is married to Pro Bowler Jeffery Lizzi and both are residents of Sandusky, Ohio where the family owns and operates Star Lanes. Her husband won the  1992 Brunswick Memorial World Open, defeating PBA Hall of Famer Amleto Monacelli in the title match, 247-192

References

1966 births
Living people
American ten-pin bowling players
People from Linden, New Jersey
People from Sandusky, Ohio
Sportspeople from Union County, New Jersey
Bowling broadcasters